Jakob Edsen  (born 1993) is a Danish orienteering competitor. He was born in Aarhus. He competed at the 2018 World Orienteering Championships in Latvia, where he placed 15th in the sprint final, and won a bronze medal in the mixed sprint relay with the Danish team. He won a silver medal in the relay at the 2012 Junior World Orienteering Championships in Kosice, and placed fourth in the sprint and seventh in the long distance in the same championship.

References

External links
 

Danish orienteers
Male orienteers
1993 births
Living people
Sportspeople from Aarhus
Junior World Orienteering Championships medalists
Competitors at the 2022 World Games